John Francis Ryan (21 October 1909 – 10 June 1989) was an Australian rules footballer who played with Essendon and Fitzroy in the Victorian Football League (VFL).

Family
The son of Sydney Arthur Ryan (1884-1964), and Mary Ryan (1883-1967), née Edis, John Francis Ryan was born in Kyabram, Victoria on 21 October 1909.

He married Jemima "Mimie" Thompson (1909-1992) in 1932. They had two children.

Football

Essendon (VFL)
A rover, and a regular player with the Second XVIII, he played for the Essendon First XVIII in five senior games, scoring 4 goals, over two seasons: 1931 and 1932.

Fitzroy (VFL)
He transferred to Fitzroy in June 1932, and played his first game for Fitzroy against Hawthorn, at the Brunswick Street Oval, on 25 June 1932.

Military service
Ryan served in the Australian Army during World War II.

Death
He died on 10 June 1989.

Notes

References
 
 Maplestone, M., Flying Higher: History of the Essendon Football Club 1872–1996, Essendon Football Club, (Melbourne), 1996. 
 World War II Nominal Roll: Lance Sergeant John Francis Ryan (VX72668), Department of Veterans' Affairs.
 A13860, VX72668: World War Two Service Record: Lance Sergeant John Francis Ryan (VX72668), National Archives of Australia.
 B883, VX72668: World War Two Service Record: Lance Sergeant John Francis Ryan (VX72668), National Archives of Australia.

External links 

1909 births
1989 deaths
Australian rules footballers from Victoria (Australia)
Essendon Football Club players
Fitzroy Football Club players
Brunswick Football Club players